The  is a temple of the Tendai sect in Kakogawa, Hyōgo, Japan. 
It was established by Prince Shōtoku's instruction in 589.

Kakurin-ji's Taishidō was completed in 1112, and Main Hall was finished in 1397. Both are National Treasures of Japan.

Building list 
Taishidō - National Treasure of Japan. It was built in 1112.
Main Hall - National Treasure of Japan. It was built in 1397.
Jōgyōdō - Important Cultural Property of Japan. It was built in Heian period.
Gyōjadō - Important Cultural Property of Japan. It was built in 1406.
Bell tower - Important Cultural Property of Japan. It was built in 1407.
Gomadō - Important Cultural Property of Japan. It was built in 1563.
Pagoda -　It was built in  Muromachi period.
Sanmon - It was built in 1672.
Kannondō - It was built in 1705.
Kodō
Shin-Yakushidō

See also 
National Treasures of Japan
List of National Treasures of Japan (temples)
Historical Sites of Prince Shōtoku

External links 

Official Site (Japanese)

6th-century establishments in Japan
National Treasures of Japan
Important Cultural Properties of Japan
Tendai temples
Buddhist temples in Hyōgo Prefecture
Prince Shōtoku
Religious buildings and structures completed in 589